SLHS may refer to:

Seven Lakes High School, a high school located in Katy, Texas.
Standley Lake High School, a high school located in Westminster, Colorado.
San Leandro High School, a high school located in San Leandro, California.
Shilin High School of Commerce, a high school located in Taipei, Taiwan.
Show Low High School, a high school located in Show Low, Arizona
Spanaway Lake High School, a high school located in Spanaway, Washington
South Lakes High School, a high school located in Reston, Virginia.
South Lyon High School, a high school located in South Lyon, Michigan.